Zahoczewie  (Zahochevya) is a village in the administrative district of Gmina Baligród, within Lesko County, Subcarpathian Voivodeship, in south-eastern Poland. The river Hoczewka (a tributary of the San) flows through the village. There, the main road is located, while the hills around said road are settled by homes.

History
Piotr from Zboiska, a standard-bearer, owned the lands from 1435 to 1465. Until 1532 it was the property of Podkomory Piotr Herburt. His son, Mikołaj Herburt, succeeded as the new owner of the land. During the XIX century Rafał Osuchowski and his associates ruled over the territory. Until 1939, a manor house owned by Roman Witoszyński was located in the village.

References

Zahoczewie